Shutt may refer to:

 Albert Shutt (born 1952), an English cricketer
 Carl Shutt (born 1961), an English football player
 David Shutt, Baron Shutt of Greetland, British politician
 Elsie Shutt (born 1928), an American computer programmer and entrepreneur
 Isaac Thomas Shutt (1818–1879) British architect and hotel owner
 Ken Shutt (1928-2010), an American painter and sculptor
 Steve Shutt (born 1952), a Canadian ice hockey player
 Topper Shutt, a television meteorologist